Yomra (Greek: Γέμουρα) is a town and district of Trabzon Province in the Black Sea region of Turkey. The mayor is Mustafa Bıyık (Good Party).

References

External links
District governor's official website 
District municipality's official website 

 
Populated places in Trabzon Province
Fishing communities in Turkey
Populated coastal places in Turkey
Districts of Trabzon Province